The National Bank of Serbia is the central bank of Serbia. Founded in 1884, the responsibilities of the bank are: monetary policy, sole issuer of Serbian banknotes and coins, protection of price stability and promotion of stability of the financial system within Serbia. The bodies of the NBS are the executive board, the Governor and the Council of the Governor.

The incumbent governor of the bank is Jorgovanka Tabaković.

History

The bank was originally established on 2 July 1884 as the Privileged National Bank of the Kingdom of Serbia. It was modeled after the National Bank of Belgium, considered at the time to be at the forefront of modern banking institutions. The first governor of the bank was Aleksa Spasić. Following the First World War, the bank underwent several changes as the country expanded and eventually became Yugoslavia, whilst the bank was renamed the National Bank of Yugoslavia. It wasn't until 2006 that the last remnant of Yugoslavia disappeared and the bank returned to minting Serbian currency, and its original name, the National Bank of Serbia.

Predecessors
 Privileged National Bank of the Kingdom of Serbia (2 July 1884 – 20 January 1920)
 National Bank of the Kingdom of Serbs, Croats and Slovenes (20 January 1920 – 3 October 1929)
 National Bank of the Kingdom of Yugoslavia (3 October 1929 – September 1946)
 National Bank of Yugoslavia (September 1946 – 19 July 2003)
 National Bank of Serbia (19 July 2003 – present)

Functions
The National Bank of Serbia is independent and autonomous in carrying out its tasks laid down by the NBS Law and other laws, and is accountable for its work to the National Assembly of the Republic of Serbia. The primary objective of the NBS is to achieve and maintain price stability. Without prejudice to its primary objective, the NBS also contributes to maintaining and strengthening of the stability of the financial system.

The National Bank of Serbia:
 determines and implements the monetary and foreign exchange policies
 manages foreign exchange reserves
 determines and implements, within its scope of authority, the activities and measures aimed at maintaining and strengthening the stability of the financial system
 issues banknotes and coins and manages cash circulation
 regulates, controls and promotes smooth performance of domestic and cross-border payment transactions, in accordance with law
 issues and revokes operating licenses, carries out prudential supervision of bank operations and performs other activities in accordance with the law governing banks
 performs other tasks within its scope of authority, in accordance with law

Governors

Below is the list of the governors of the National Bank of Serbia since its re-establishment in 2003.
 Mlađan Dinkić (4 February 2003 – 22 July 2003) 
 Kori Udovički (23 July 2003 – 25 February 2004) 
 Radovan Jelašić (25 February 2004 – 28 July 2010) 
 Dejan Šoškić (28 July 2010 – 6 August 2012)
 Jorgovanka Tabaković (6 August 2012 – present)

Management of the Bank
Current management of the bank includes:
 Jorgovanka Tabaković, Governor 
 Veselin Pješčić, Vice-Governor 
 Diana Dragutinović, Vice-Governor 
 Đorđe Jevtić, Director of the Administration for Supervision of Financial Institutions

See also

 Serbian dinar
 List of governors of national banks of Serbia and Yugoslavia
 Banking in Serbia
 Insurance in Serbia
 List of banks in Serbia

References

External links 

 

Economy of Serbia
Serbia
1884 establishments in Serbia
Banks established in 1884
Banks of Serbia
Savski Venac